Amfepramone, also known as diethylpropion, is a stimulant drug of the phenethylamine, amphetamine, and cathinone classes that is used as an appetite suppressant. It is used in the short-term management of obesity, along with dietary and lifestyle changes. Amfepramone is most closely chemically related to the antidepressant and smoking cessation aid bupropion (previously called amfebutamone), which has also been developed as a weight-loss medicine when in a combination product with naltrexone.

Pharmacology 
Amfepramone itself lacks any affinity for the monoamine transporters and instead functions as a prodrug to ethcathinone. Ethcathinone (and therefore amfepramone as well) is a very weak dopaminergic and serotonergic, and is approximately 10x and 20x stronger on norepinephrine in comparison, respectively. As a result, ethcathinone and amfepramone can essentially be considered a member of the class of drugs known as norepinephrine releasing agents (NRAs).

Chemistry
Amfepramone can be synthesized from propiophenone by bromination, followed by reaction with diethylamine.

Society and culture

Names
Another medically-utilized name is diethylpropion (British Approved Name (BAN) and Australian Approved Name (AAN)). Chemical names include: α-methyl-β-keto-N,N-diethylphenethylamine, N,N-diethyl-β-ketoamphetamine and N,N-diethylcathinone. Brand names include: Anorex, Linea, Nobesine, Prefamone, Regenon, Tepanil and Tenuate.

Legal status 
Amfepramone is classified as a Schedule IV controlled substance in the United States. In the UK amfepramone is a class C drug  and as a medicine, it is a Schedule 3 Controlled Drug which requires safe custody.

As of June 2022, the safety committee of the European Medicines Agency (EMA) recommends the withdrawal of marketing authorizations for amfepramone.

Recreational use 
The authors of several studies of amfepramone claim that the substance has a relatively low potential for causing addiction in users.

References

External links 
 

Anorectics
Cathinones
Diethylamino compounds
Norepinephrine-dopamine releasing agents
Stimulants
Substituted amphetamines
Withdrawn drugs
World Anti-Doping Agency prohibited substances